Dierdre Bowen is a Canadian casting director. She is most noted for winning the Canadian Screen Award for Best Casting in a Television Series at the 5th Canadian Screen Awards in 2017, for her work on the television series Kim's Convenience.

She has been nominated in the category ten other times at both the Canadian Screen awards and their predecessor Gemini Awards, as well as receiving four nominations for Best Casting in a Film.

Awards

References

External links

Canadian casting directors
Women casting directors
Canadian Screen Award winners
Living people
Year of birth missing (living people)
Canadian women in film